Yamid Salcedo Haad (born September 2, 1977) is a Colombian former professional baseball catcher who played in Major League Baseball.

In a brief stint with the Pittsburgh Pirates in 1999, Haad went 0-for-1 in one game played. In 2005, he served as the Giant's backup catcher behind Mike Matheny since previous backup Yorvit Torrealba was traded to the Seattle Mariners. Haad's playing time with the Giants was limited to only 10 starts, with Matheny starting the large majority of games, until a steroids suspension ended his season. For the year, he had only two hits in 28 at-bats, for a batting average of .071.

On December 1, 2006, the Tampa Bay Devil Rays signed him to a minor league contract and invited him to spring training for the 2007 season. On April 9, 2007, Haad signed a minor league contract with the Cleveland Indians.

On June 12, 2008, Haad was called up by the Indians, but on June 19, Haad was designated for assignment in favor of veteran catcher Sal Fasano without appearing in a game.

In February 2009, Haad signed a minor league contract with the Seattle Mariners.

Haad played for the Tecolotes de Nuevo Laredo of the Mexican League in 2010.

Steroids
On May 31, 2006, Haad received a 50-game suspension for testing positive for performance-enhancing drugs.

References

External links

1977 births
Living people
Colombian expatriate baseball players in the United States
Major League Baseball players from Colombia
Major League Baseball catchers
Baseball players suspended for drug offenses
Colombian sportspeople in doping cases
Pittsburgh Pirates players
San Francisco Giants players
Sportspeople from Cartagena, Colombia
Erie SeaWolves players
Lynchburg Hillcats players
Altoona Curve players
Nashville Sounds players
Mobile BayBears players
Orlando Rays players
Durham Bulls players
Portland Beavers players
Fresno Grizzlies players
Salem-Keizer Volcanoes players
San Jose Giants players
Buffalo Bisons (minor league) players
West Tennessee Diamond Jaxx players
Tecolotes de Nuevo Laredo players
Colombian expatriate baseball players in Mexico